Road to Avonlea is a Canadian television series first broadcast in Canada between January 7, 1990, and March 31, 1996, as part of the CBC Family Hour anthology series, and in the United States starting on March 5, 1990. It was created by Kevin Sullivan and produced by Sullivan Films (later Sullivan Entertainment) in association with  the Canadian Broadcasting Corporation (CBC) and the Disney Channel, with additional funding from Telefilm Canada. It follows the adventures of Sara Stanley, a young girl sent to live with her relatives in early 20th-century eastern Canada. It was loosely adapted from novels by Lucy Maud Montgomery, with many characters and episodes inspired by her stories.

Some episodes were turned into independent books by various authors; around 30 titles have been released.

In the United States, its title was shortened to Avonlea, and a number of episodes were retitled and reordered. The series was released on VHS and DVD there as Tales from Avonlea.

Background and development
The series was initially loosely inspired from a number of books by Lucy Maud Montgomery, primarily The Story Girl and The Golden Road, both of which feature the character of Sara Stanley, as well as Felicity, Felix, and Cecily. These books, while set in Prince Edward Island, did not take place in the village of Avonlea.  Many of the series' episodes and situations were adapted from stories recounted in Montgomery's Chronicles of Avonlea and Further Chronicles of Avonlea.

Many supporting characters were sourced from Montgomery's Anne of Green Gables series. The show is set within the same continuity as Sullivan's 1985 film and its 1987 sequel based on the Anne novels. Rachel Lynde, Marilla Cuthbert, and Muriel Stacy all originally appeared in Montgomery's debut novel Anne of Green Gables, with Rachel and Marilla being briefly mentioned in passing in Chronicles of Avonlea. Patricia Hamilton, Colleen Dewhurst, and Marilyn Lightstone, who had played the characters in the films, returned for Road to Avonlea.  The characters of Davy and Dora Keith were originally from Anne of Avonlea, the first sequel to Anne Of Green Gables.  Anne Shirley herself never appeared, although she was referred to on rare occasions.

Some episodes of the show were turned into independent books by different authors. Around 30 titles have been released.

In the United States, its title was shortened to simply Avonlea, and a number of episodes were retitled and reordered. When the series was released on VHS and DVD in the United States, the title changed from Road to Avonlea to Tales from Avonlea.

The series is set in the fictional small town of Avonlea, Prince Edward Island, in the early 20th century (1903–1912). Ten-year-old Montreal heiress Sara Stanley (Sarah Polley) is sent by her wealthy father to live with her two maiden aunts, Hetty and Olivia King, to be near her late mother's side of the family after an embezzlement scandal results in him being placed under house arrest. The show's focus shifted over the years from Sara's interactions with locals to stories about the King family. Later seasons of the show focused more on residents of Avonlea who were connected to the King family. Sarah Polley left the show in 1994, returning for a guest appearance in the sixth season as well as the series finale episode.

Following the series proper, a reunion TV movie called An Avonlea Christmas was produced in 1998.

Characters

Major characters
 Sara Stanley (Sarah Polley): An adventurous 10-year-old girl used to fine living in Montreal who must learn to adjust to a simpler life in Avonlea when her father runs into legal trouble. She moves into Rose Cottage with her late mother's sisters, Hetty and Olivia King, and later concerns herself with matchmaking in the conservative town. Sarah Polley left the show after season five, though she made two guest appearances in the fifth episode of season six and in the series finale. Sara is mentioned but does not appear in An Avonlea Christmas.
 Henrietta "Hetty" King (Jackie Burroughs): The oldest King sibling and head of the King family who lives at Rose Cottage with her sister Olivia. She is a strict disciplinarian and the Avonlea schoolteacher. In later seasons, she takes in Rachel Lynde and twins Davy and Dora Keith. In An Avonlea Christmas, she plans a holiday concert with her students, only to discover she needs an operation for a tumor. Burroughs had previously portrayed Amelia Evans in Anne of Green Gables.
 Olivia King (Mag Ruffman): The youngest King sibling. Affectionate and sensitive, most of her experiences throughout the series involve her social dealings with other Avonlea residents. She goes on to marry Jasper Dale, with whom she has a son named Montgomery, and they later adopt a baby girl named Alicia. In An Avonlea Christmas, Jasper misses the ship to Avonlea and Olivia begins to question their marriage. Ruffman had previously portrayed Alice Lawson in Anne of Green Gables and Anne of Green Gables: The Sequel.
 Alec King (Cedric Smith): Sara's uncle and the brother of Hetty, Olivia, Roger, and Sara's mother, Ruth. He is a farmer and lives with his family at King Farm next door to Rose Cottage. He is more level-headed and the voice of reason when Hetty is uncompromising or stubborn. Smith had previously portrayed Reverend Allan in Anne of Green Gables.
 Janet King (Lally Cadeau): Alec's loving but independent-minded wife, the mother of Felicity, Felix, Cecily, and Daniel King, and sister of Abigail MacEwan.
 Felicity King (Gema Zamprogna): Alec and Janet's eldest child. She insists on having adult responsibilities and feels superior to her younger siblings and her cousins. Throughout the series, she wants to be a wife, a teacher, and a doctor, and later runs the Avonlea Foundling Home. In season two, she grows close to Gus Pike and later accepts his proposal. They marry in the series finale. In An Avonlea Christmas, Gus is working for the War Department in Halifax and Felicity becomes pregnant with their first child.
 Felix King (Zachary Bennett): Alec and Janet's mischievous and troublesome older son. He befriends Izzy Pettibone, the daughter of the widower schoolteacher who takes over after Hetty retires. In later seasons, their friendship turns into romance.
 Cecily King (Harmony Cramp season 1–5, Molly Atkinson seasons 6-7): Alec and Janet's younger daughter. She is more interested in farm work than her brother Felix, and Alec considers leaving the farm to her. The actress change happens after she is sent to a sanitarium for tuberculosis.
 Daniel King (played by Alex and Ryan Floyd): Alec and Janet's youngest child who is born at the end of season two.
 Andrew King (Joel Blake): Another King cousin who is sent to live on King Farm at the same time as Sara. His father Roger is the brother of Hetty, Olivia, Alec, and Ruth; he and Sara were born exactly a year apart. In season two, his father returns and takes Andrew back to Halifax.

Secondary characters
  Gus Pike (Michael Mahonen): A young vagabond and sailor known for using Maritimer English. He leaves Avonlea for a time to find his thought-to-be-dead mother. He is presumed dead after a hurricane, but Felicity and Hetty find him along the eastern shore of the United States. He marries Felicity in the series finale.
 Jasper Dale (R.H. Thomson): An inventor and photographer with a stutter who eventually marries Olivia. They buy the local cannery, which burns down in the final season, and adopt a baby girl from a former cannery worker before moving to Europe.
 Eliza Ward (Kay Tremblay): Janet and Abigail's eccentric and overbearing great-aunt who often visits King Farm. She later moves in with them and her wit and wisdom become indispensable to the King family.
 Rachel Lynde (Patricia Hamilton):  The local busybody and self-appointed moral guardian of Avonlea. Her character originally appeared in Anne of Green Gables. She initially lives with Marilla Cuthbert at the Green Gables farm. After Marilla's death and suffering a stroke, she moves to Rose Cottage with Hetty King to raise Davey and Dora Keith.
 Marilla Cuthbert (Colleen Dewhurst): Rachel's more-tolerant best friend who has never married and lived with her late brother Matthew for many years. She originally appeared in Anne of Green Gables. In the second season, she adopts Davey and Dora Keith, the orphaned twins of her distant relative. After Dewhurst's death in 1991, Marilla's death was written into the season 3 finale, leaving Rachel to care for the children.
 Davey Keith (Kyle Labine): Marilla's orphaned relative who comes to live at Green Gables with his twin sister, Dora. Davey is wild and rambunctious, often getting into trouble. He later moves to Rose Cottage with Rachel and Dora. He does not appear in An Avonlea Christmas. In Anne of Green Gables: The Continuing Story, Rachel tells Anne Shirley Blythe that Davey has enlisted in World War I.
 Dora Keith (Ashley Muscroft seasons 2-3, Lindsay Murrell seasons 4-7): Davey's sweet and well-behaved twin sister who moves with him to Green Gables after the death of their mother.
Abigail MacEwan (Rosemary Dunsmore): The sister of Janet King, the wife of Malcolm MacEwan, the adoptive mother of Lucky, and the aunt of Felicity, Felix, Cecily and Daniel King. Dunsmore previously portrayed Katherine Brooke in Anne of Green Gables: The Sequel.
 Muriel Stacey (Marilyn Lightstone): A schoolteacher recently promoted to superintendent and Hetty's rival. Her character originally appeared in Anne of Green Gables.  She later takes over Lawson's general store and marries Clive Pettibone. Though she does not appear in An Avonlea Christmas, her voice narrates the beginning.
 Clive Pettibone (David Fox): The widower of Jessica Hepworth and the father of Arthur, Izzy, and Morgan, who takes over the Avonlea school from Hetty. He is a former Army colonel and strict disciplinarian. He is later promoted to superintendent and marries Miss Stacey.
 Isolde "Izzy" Pettibone (Heather Brown): Clive's youngest child and only daughter. A tomboy, she quickly befriends Felix King and eventually becomes his romantic interest. As a child, she wanted to be like her father and aspires to be the first female general in the British army.
 Elvira Lawson (Alva Mai Hoover): The wife of the Lawson's general store owner and a local Avonlea gossip.
 Clara Potts (Maja Ardal): A town gossip who is disliked by many in Avonlea. She is married to Bert Potts and has a daughter named Sally.
 Bert Potts (Roger Dunn): The husband of Clara and the father of Sally Potts.
 Eulalie Bugle (Barbara Hamilton): Another town gossip most often seen with Clara Potts or Rachel Lynde. Barbara Hamilton is the sister of Patricia Hamilton and had played Marilla Cuthbert in the 1972 British miniseries Anne of Green Gables and its sequel Anne of Avonlea.
 Simon Tremayne (Ian D. Clark): Hetty King's business partner and the owner of the White Sands hotel. He is the disinherited first-born son of the Duke of Arranagh.
 Archie Gillis (John Friesen): The owner of the local sawmill, an arrogant bully, and the self-appointed coach of the Avonlea Avengers hockey team.

Guest stars
Many famous actors made guest appearances on the show, including

 Frances Bay
 Bruce Greenwood
 Christopher Lloyd
 Christopher Reeve
 Diana Rigg
 Dianne Wiest
 Eugene Levy
 Faye Dunaway
 Jaimz Woolvett
 John Neville
 Kate Nelligan
 Laura Bertram
 Madeline Kahn
 Malcolm Stoddard
 Marc Worden
 Maureen Stapleton
 Meg Tilly
 Michael York
 Ned Beatty
 Peter Coyote
 Robby Benson
 Ryan Gosling
 Sheila McCarthy
 Shirley Douglas
 Stockard Channing
 Treat Williams
 Tyler Labine
 Zoe Caldwell
 Wayne Robson
 W.O. Mitchell

Episodes

Locations
The Road to Avonlea set was constructed in Uxbridge, Ontario—the town where Lucy Maud Montgomery lived and wrote for a decade after moving from Prince Edward Island. The town of Avonlea was adapted from existing buildings. Its roads were painted red in an attempt to match the distinctive color of the island's iron-rich soil. Filming also took place regularly at Westfield Heritage Centre in Flamborough, Ontario. Photography and enhanced digital matter work married second-unit scenes of Prince Edward Island with the Leaskdale location where necessary.

Home media
Sullivan Entertainment released all seven seasons on DVD in Region 1 for the first time between 2005 and 2006. In 2009, they began re-releasing the series in wide screen format. As of December 2012, all seven seasons and the Christmas special had been released in widescreen format.

In 2016, Sullivan Entertainment announced it would launch their own streaming service called Gazebo TV that would feature the Road to Avonlea series among other titles produced by the company. The service launched in early 2017.

Ratings
The series debut garnered 2.527 million (2+) viewers.

Awards and nominations
During Road to Avonleas seven-year run, it won and was nominated for numerous awards worldwide:
 16 Emmy nominations, four Emmy Award wins: Outstanding Lead Actor in a Dramatic Series (Christopher Lloyd) - "Another Point of View", 1992; Outstanding Children's Program - "Incident At Vernon River", 1993; Outstanding Costume Design for a Series - "Strictly Melodrama", 1995; Outstanding Guest Actress in a Dramatic Series (Dianne Wiest) - "Woman of Importance", 1997.
 17 CableAce nominations, four CableAce Awards: Best Dramatic Series, 1991; Best Dramatic Series, 1993; Best Dramatic Series, 1994; Best Writing in a Dramatic Series (Heather Conkie)
 18 Gemini Awards: Best Direction, Best Costume Design, Best Original Score (John Welsman), Best Performance by a Lead Actress (Jackie Burroughs), 1990; Best Original Score, Best Performance by a Lead Actress (Jackie Burroughs), 1991; Best Leading Actor (Cedric Smith), Best Guest Performance in a Series (Kate Nelligan), Best Direction in a Series (Allan King), 1992; Best Actress (Jackie Burroughs), 1993; Best Guest Performance in a Series (Bruce Greenwood), Best Original Score, Best Actress (Lally Cadeau), 1994; Best Supporting Actress (Patricia Hamilton), Best Original Score, 1995; Best Supporting Actress (Kay Tremblay), Best Guest Actress (Frances Bay), Best Original Score, 1996.
 Six Gemini nominations
 Three John Labatt Classic Awards for Most Popular Program in Canada (chosen by the public), 1990, 1991, and 1992

International broadcasters of Road to Avonlea

North America
 : ZAZ

Central America
 : FETV Canal 5

South America
 : Canal 9 Libertad (1992–1997) (2000–2002 known Azul TV) / Channel 20 (2005–2010) / Magazine TV Pay (Cable, Satellite and IPTV) (2004–present)
 : Canal 13 RPC (1992–1997) (2000–2002) / Paravisión (2005–2010) / Channel 8 of CVC and 31 of TVD (2004–present)
 : Canal 10 (1992–1997) / TCC (2004–present)

Europe
 : Bibel tv
 : TVP1, TV Puls
 : RTS, RTV BK Telecom, B92, RTS1
 : M1, Duna TV, Story4, Prime, IzauraTV, TV2 Kids
 : Artı Bir TV
 : CyBC
 : Hellenic Broadcasting Corporation
 : ITV3
 : Evangelische Omroep, SBS 6, Family 7
 : VTM, Vitaya (2013)
 : Rai 1 (2001)
 : Yle TV1
 : HRT
 : TVR1, TVR2
 : RTP1

Asia
 : NHK (1993–1994, 1996–1997), LaLa TV (2011)
 : IRIB TV2 & Namayesh TV & Omid TV & Tamasha TV
 : VTV3
 : Saudi 2 (1994)

See also

 An Avonlea Christmas

References

External links
 - Official Disney Avonlea Page
 Road to Avonlea - Official Road to Avonlea Series Website
 
 Museum of Broadcast Communications information on Road to Avonlea (Archive)
 Road to Avonlea at L.M. Montgomery Online
 Gazebo TV Website

1990s American drama television series
1990s Canadian drama television series
1990 American television series debuts
1990 Canadian television series debuts
1996 American television series endings
1996 Canadian television series endings
Anne of Green Gables television series
CBC Television original programming
Disney Channel original programming
Period family drama television series
Primetime Emmy Award-winning television series
Television series about children
Television shows set in Canada
Television shows set in Montreal
Television shows set in Prince Edward Island
Television series set in the 1900s
Television series set in the 1910s